The 2019 BoyleSports World Grand Prix was the 22nd staging of the World Grand Prix. It was held from 6–12 October 2019 at the Citywest Hotel in Dublin, Ireland.

Michael van Gerwen was the defending champion, after defeating Peter Wright 5–2 in the 2018 final, and he successfully defended the Grand Prix for the first time, winning the title for the fifth time overall with a 5–2 win against Dave Chisnall in the final.

Prize money
The total prize money increased from £400,000 to £450,000.

The following is the breakdown of the fund:

Qualification
The field of 32 players included the top 16 on the PDC Order of Merit and the top 16 non-qualified players from the ProTour Order of Merit; the top eight players seeded for the tournament.

PDC Order of Merit (1–16) (Top 8 seeded)
  Michael van Gerwen (champion)
  Rob Cross (second round)
  Daryl Gurney (first round)
  Gary Anderson (second round)
  Michael Smith (second round)
  Gerwyn Price (first round)
  Peter Wright (second round)
  James Wade (second round)
  Mensur Suljović (first round)
  Ian White (quarter-finals)
  Dave Chisnall (runner-up)
  Simon Whitlock (first round)
  Nathan Aspinall (quarter-finals)
  Jonny Clayton (first round)
  Adrian Lewis (first round)
  Joe Cullen (first round)

Pro Tour
  Krzysztof Ratajski (first round)
  Glen Durrant (semi-finals)
  Jermaine Wattimena (quarter-finals)
  Jamie Hughes (first round)
  Jeffrey de Zwaan (second round)
  Ricky Evans (first round)
  Steve Beaton (first round)
  Keegan Brown (first round)
  Chris Dobey (semi-finals)
  Stephen Bunting (second round)
  Danny Noppert (second round)
  Max Hopp (first round)
  John Henderson (first round)
  Vincent van der Voort (first round)
  Mervyn King (quarter-finals)
  Dimitri Van den Bergh (first round)

Draw

References

External links
Tournament website

World Grand Prix (darts)
World Grand Prix
World Grand Prix (darts)
International sports competitions in Dublin (city)
World Grand Prix
World Grand Prix (darts), 2019